Hēmi Pōtatau (20 May 1904 – 18 January 1994) was a New Zealand Presbyterian minister, soldier, writer. Of Māori descent, he identified with the Ngāti Kahungunu and Ngāti Rākaipaaka iwi. He was born in Nūhaka, Hawke's Bay, New Zealand, in 1904. He also wrote the Scots College haka in 1959.

References

1904 births
1994 deaths
New Zealand military personnel
New Zealand Presbyterians
New Zealand writers
People from Nūhaka
Ngāti Kahungunu people
Ngati Rakaipaaka people
New Zealand Māori religious leaders
New Zealand Māori writers
New Zealand Māori soldiers